The Messenger of Mathematics is a defunct British mathematics journal. The founding editor-in-chief was William Allen Whitworth with Charles Taylor and volumes 1–58 were published between 1872 and 1929. James Whitbread Lee Glaisher was the editor-in-chief after Whitworth. In the nineteenth century, foreign contributions represented 4.7% of all pages of mathematics in the journal.

History 
The journal was originally titled Oxford, Cambridge and Dublin Messenger of Mathematics. It was supported by mathematics students and governed by a board of editors composed of members of the universities of Oxford, Cambridge and Dublin (the last being its sole constituent college, Trinity College Dublin). Volumes 1–5 were published between 1862 and 1871. It merged with The Quarterly Journal of Pure and Applied Mathematics to form the Quarterly Journal of Mathematics.

References

Further reading

External links
Messenger of Mathematics, vols. 1–30 (1871–1901) digitized by the Center for Retrospective Digitization.

Defunct journals of the United Kingdom
English-language journals
Mathematics education in the United Kingdom
Mathematics journals
Publications established in 1862
Publications disestablished in 1929

1862 establishments in England